This article details Car Nos. 24–27 of the Manx Electric Railway on the Isle of Man.

This was the sixth batch of tramcars delivered.  These open cars were purchased from G.F. Milnes & Co., in 1898 and only No. 24 has been lost, and this was in the 1930 fire at Laxey.  Of those remaining, car 25 was stripped of her trucks and motors in 2003 and these have since been fitted to the "new" dedicated works car, now known as car 34.  Also, car 26 has been out of service for many years, and 27 is a permanent way "hack" having more recently received a striped yellow and black paint scene to her dash panels, and prior to this a somewhat makeshift windscreen.

References

Sources
 Manx Manx Electric Railway Fleetlist (2002) Manx Electric Railway Society
 Island Island Images: Manx Electric Railway Pages (2003) Jon Wornham
 Official Official Tourist Department Page (2009) Isle Of Man Heritage Railways

Manx Electric Railway